The 2015 AAA Texas 500 was a NASCAR Sprint Cup Series race held on November 8, 2015, at Texas Motor Speedway in Fort Worth, Texas. Contested over 334 laps on the 1.5 mile (2.4 km) intermediate quad-oval, it was the 34th race of the 2015 NASCAR Sprint Cup Series season, eighth race of the Chase and second race of the Eliminator Round. Jimmie Johnson won the race, his fifth of the season. Brad Keselowski finished second. Kevin Harvick, Kyle Busch and Carl Edwards rounded out the top-five.

Keselowski won the pole for the race and led a race high of 312 laps on his way to a runner-up finish. The race had 15 lead changes among eight different drivers, as well as nine caution flag periods for 47 laps.

This was the 75th career victory for Johnson, fifth of the season, sixth at Texas Motor Speedway and eighth at the track for Hendrick Motorsports. The win moved him up to 12th in the points standings. Chevrolet left Texas with a 63–point lead over Toyota in the manufacturer standings.

The AAA Texas 500 was carried by NBC Sports on the broadcast NBC network for the American television audience. The radio broadcast for the race was carried by the Performance Racing Network and Sirius XM NASCAR Radio.

Report

Background

Texas Motor Speedway is a speedway located in the northernmost portion of the U.S. city of Fort Worth, Texas – the portion located in Denton County, Texas. The track measures  around and is banked 24 degrees in the turns, and is of the oval design, where the front straightaway juts outward slightly. The track layout is similar to Atlanta Motor Speedway and Charlotte Motor Speedway (formerly Lowe's Motor Speedway). The track is owned by Speedway Motorsports, Inc., the same company that owns Atlanta and Charlotte Motor Speedways, as well as the short-track Bristol Motor Speedway.

Jeff Gordon entered with an eight–point over Kyle Busch and Martin Truex Jr. Kevin Harvick entered fourth 10–points back. Carl Edwards entered fifth 17–points back. Brad Keselowski entered sixth 34–points back. Kurt Busch entered seventh 36–points back. Joey Logano entered eighth 38–points back.

Driver suspension
On the Tuesday after the 2015 Goody's Headache Relief Shot 500, NASCAR suspended Matt Kenseth for two races for his role in the incident that took out Joey Logano. According to NASCAR Executive Vice-President and Chief Racing Development Officer Steve O'Donnell, Kenseth "eliminated the No. 22 car’s opportunity to continue to compete in the race. Additionally, we factored aspects of safety into our decision, and also the fact that the new Chase elimination format puts a premium on each and every race. These actions have no place in NASCAR.” Shortly after the announcement, Joe Gibbs Racing announced that they would appeal the decision and "challenge the severity of the penalty which is believed to be inconsistent with previous penalties for similar on-track incidents. There will be no further comments from JGR personnel during the appeal process."

On the Thursday before this weekend's race, the National Motorsports Appeals Panel upheld the original penalty levied by NASCAR. Later that day, National Motorsports Final Appeals Officer Bryan Moss upheld the two race suspension, but amended the probation penalty to conclude on December 31 instead of in six months.

Erik Jones drove in place of Kenseth this weekend. He said that being "part of that next wave that people think [of] is pretty cool and a pretty big honor. I never thought I’d be in that position. A few years ago, I kind of wondered where is my opportunity going to come from, where is my spot going to be in the sport? But everything works out at the end of the day, and it’s working out more and more every day.”

This marked the first race since the 1999 NAPA 500 that Kenseth didn’t compete in, snapping a 571 race starting streak.

Hauler fire
On the Thursday before the race, the hauler carrying the primary and backup cars for HScott Motorsports's Michael Annett caught fire on Interstate 20 west of Longview, Texas. A team spokesperson said nobody was injured and the team sent a spare hauler from their shop in Spartanburg, South Carolina. However, it was unable to make it to the track prior to the garage opening at 8:00 a.m. Eastern time Friday, so Annett used the backup car of teammate Justin Allgaier to race this weekend. The spare cars served as both drivers' backups.

Entry list
The entry list for the AAA Texas 500 was released on Monday, November 2 at 12:21 p.m. Eastern time. Forty-five cars were entered for the race. All but Ryan Blaney and Michael McDowell were entered in the previous week's race at Martinsville. Joey Gase returned to the seat of the No. 32 Go FAS Racing Ford. Brian Scott returned to the seat of the No. 33 Hillman-Circle Sport LLC Chevrolet. Reed Sorenson drove the No. 62 Premium Motorsports Chevrolet. With Kenseth being parked by NASCAR, Erik Jones made his second career Sprint Cup Series start in the No. 20 Toyota.

First practice
The other two practice sessions scheduled on Saturday were cancelled because NASCAR had difficulties drying the track due to a combination of overnight rain, high humidity and weepers (water seeping out of the surface of the track which happens largely at tracks with older asphalt surfaces).

Qualifying

Brad Keselowski won the pole with a time of 27.421 . He said that his "Wurth Ford Fusion has been really good since we unloaded. Very similar to where we were at Kansas - really fast in practice and really fast in qualifying. But we just need that to stay with us in the race and we didn't get that in Kansas." He also joked that his team will "have the first pit stall and we get to keep it this time. We are really excited about the race Sunday.” Kevin Harvick, who qualified second, said that he practically "ran the same speed in all three rounds there. Didn’t quite have the raw speed in the first round, but this is a racetrack where you want the car to keep going as long as you can. Felt like we had a good start to our race trim practice today and going to have a good spot to start on Sunday.” Kyle Busch, who qualified third, said that while his team doesn't "need to win...we would love to win. I feel like this is a good opportunity for us to have a really good day and for us to score a victory. We come to every race trying to win and this one’s no different. I hope that Texas will bode well for us and we can score that win. If not, a solid top-five finish is exactly what we need. That’s where we need to be at the end of the day and carry on that momentum and go into Phoenix and hope for another solid day there.” Joey Logano, who qualified fourth, said while he doesn't "think we are bad in race trim...I do think we have a little bit of work to do there, so I am anxious to get at that tomorrow and get to work on it and find a little bit more speed for Sunday." Erik Jones, who qualified sixth driving in place of the suspended Matt Kenseth, said that his qualifying run was "a really good effort for us. We made the final round at Kansas as well so it’s cool to make the final round in both our starts. We’ll see where it goes from here, obviously we’ve got a long ways to go yet for Sunday – 500 miles. This definitely helps everybody’s confidence a little bit for that.” Martin Truex Jr., who qualified 23rd, said that his car "never really clicked in qualifying trim today and that's why we're starting in the middle of the pack. But we've been there before and fought our way to the front. As I keep on saying this team never quits. We're always working hard to find the right combination and I am hopeful that our car will perform better in race trim during tomorrow's two practice sessions."

Qualifying results

Race

First half

Start
Under clear blue Texas skies, Brad Keselowski led the field to the green flag at 2:21 p.m. After the first 10 laps, he pulled to a second and a half lead over Kevin Harvick. The first caution of the race flew on lap 11 for a single–car wreck in turn 4. Halfway down the backstretch, the left-rear tire on Joey Logano's car went flat. He couldn't control the car rounding turn 3 and spun out. The damage to his fender was significant and he went a number of laps down while his crew tried to repair it. Eventually, crew chief Todd Gordon told him to take the car to the garage. Logano said afterwards that the left-rear tire "just blew apart off of Turn 2. [It] came apart and shredded everything inside the car. It did a lot more damage than just the tire blowing apart." He also said that this race "was a must-win situation as well. If we finished second today we would be in the same boat going into Phoenix. I feel great about our chances at Phoenix. It has been a great race track for us in the past. I felt like this track was a great one for us as well. It is unfortunate that we finished how we did.”

The race restarted on lap 18. Harvick and Keselowski dragged raced down the front stretch with the former take the lead on lap 19. The second caution of the race flew on lap 25 for a single-car wreck in turn 1. Ryan Blaney suffered a right-front tire blowout and slammed the wall in turn 1 and would go on to finish 43rd. Because this happened a lap before the scheduled competition caution, NASCAR race control decided to treat this as the competition caution. This meant teams could refuel the cars. Matt DiBenedetto opted not to pit and assumed the lead. He pitted the next lap and handed the lead back to Keselowski. A. J. Allmendinger was tagged for an uncontrolled tire and restarted the race from the tail-end of the field. Aric Almirola was tagged for having too many crew members over the wall and restarted the race from the tail-end of the field. Denny Hamlin took his car to the garage for issues with his fuel pump.

The race restarted on lap 30. The third caution of the race flew on lap 36 for a single-car incident in turn 1. Rounding the front stretch, Harvick's left-rear tire went down and he dove down onto the apron. After the race, crew chief Rodney Childers said that the car "had that left-rear go down and automatically you panic and think it was self-inflicted like maybe we didn’t have enough air in it, that kind of thing. As soon as I got down off the (pit) box, I saw a piece cut right in the tread. It was probably out of one of the cars that was tore up earlier."

The race restarted on lap 42. Kyle Busch edged Keselowski for the lead the next lap, but he lost it to the No. 2 car the next lap. Dale Earnhardt Jr. made an unscheduled stop for a flat right-front tire. The fourth caution of the race flew on lap 51 for a single-car spin on the front stretch. Exiting turn 4, Tony Stewart got loose and spun out into the grass. Keselowski exited pit road with the lead. Almirola was tagged again for having too many crew members over the wall and restarted the race from the tail-end of the field.

The race restarted on lap 58. Debris on the front stretch brought out the fifth caution of the race on lap 100. The debris was a shredded left-rear tire from Kyle Larson's car.

Second quarter
The race restarted on lap 107. Ryan Newman made an unscheduled stop at lap 146 after cutting down his left-rear tire exiting turn 2. This left debris on the backstretch and brought out the sixth caution of the race on lap 149. Kasey Kahne was tagged for speeding on pit road and restarted the race from the tail-end of the field.

The race restarted on lap 155. Dale Earnhardt Jr. tagged the wall with his right-rear corner. This affected the handling of his car and he began to fall back through the field. He spun in the turn 3 apron and brought out the seventh caution of the race on lap 167. A. J. Allmendinger was tagged for an uncontrolled tire and restarted the race from the tail-end of the field.

Second half

Halfway
The race restarted on lap 173. Debris in turn 2 brought out the eighth caution of the race on lap 196. The debris came from the shredded right-rear tire of Trevor Bayne's car. Dale Earnhardt Jr. was tagged for having too many crew members over the wall and restarted the race from the tail-end of the field. Joey Logano was tagged for speeding on pit road and restarted the race from the tail-end of the field.

The race restarted on lap 204. Kyle Busch and Carl Edwards kicked off a cycle of green flag stops with 84 laps to go. Brad Keselowski pitted with 83 laps to go and handed the lead to Jimmie Johnson. He pitted the next lap and the lead cycled back to Keselowski.

Fourth quarter

Kevin Harvick made an unscheduled stop with 53 laps to go for a flat right-rear tire. He fell to 20th–place in the running order and down a lap. Carl Edwards kicked off the final cycle of pit stops with 38 laps to go. Keselowski hit pit road with 37 laps to go and the lead cycled to Harvick. Denny Hamlin was tagged for speeding on pit road and was forced to serve a drive-through penalty. On 16-lap older tires, he was no match for Keselowski as he was passed with ease with 35 laps to go.

Debris in turn 2 brought out the ninth caution of the race with 24 laps to go. The debris was a shredded right front tire from Erik Jones.

The race restarted with 18 laps to go. Martin Truex Jr. edged out Keselowski to take the lead with 17 to go, but Keselowski took it back the next lap. Jimmie Johnson kept the pressure on him for the next 12 laps. He took the lead with three laps to go and scored his 75th career win.

Post-race

Driver comments
After the race, Johnson said that he "just kept pressure on him (Keselowski). I could see that he was really tight and that was the first I had seen him that vulnerable all day. I just kept the pressure on him, kept searching for line. He saw me coming on the top and protected it. I just kept trying to put pressure on him hoping for a mistake. He got real loose off of Turn 2 and I had a big run down the backstretch and drove it in really far into Turn 3 hoping to hear clear. Once I did I knew I was home free.”

Keselowski said that Johnson's "car had mega turn that last run and I couldn’t keep the turn and it kept pushing real bad. I did everything I could to hold him off but he was way faster that last run." Despite sitting 19–points out of the fourth–place Chase cutoff, he said he wasn't "sure exactly how to feel about it at the moment. The 48 car had so much speed them last 10 laps. Maybe I'll change my mind [but] I don't know what I would have done differently or could have done differently. There's always something you can do better. But not knowing what that might be at this moment makes it a little bit easier to digest."

Following a third–place finish, Harvick said that his team has "had to overcome things week after week after week. I guess those are character-building moments as you go through those weekend, but we’ve managed to survive and advance and that’s what we’ve got to do next week.” With the next race being Phoenix, he also said that the track is "definitely a good place for us to go. It’s been very successful but that doesn’t mean we’re going to go there and run good this time. We’ve got to go and try and have our ducks in a row. We’ve done a good job managing the Chase so far with all the adversity we’ve had. We’ve only really had one smooth weekend, so we’ve just got to keep doing what we’re doing and hopefully the smooth weekend is the next week and the week after.”

Kyle Busch said of his fourth–place finish that it ended up being "a really good day for us. Obviously, just being able to run our own race and to perform the way we did, I felt like it was pretty good. I wish we had a little bit faster car on the short runs for sure. I think that was kind of where we lost most of our time here today. Once things got single filed out, spread out, our car was a little better on the long runs. At least we did have some speed in our car on one side of the run where we could make up some ground and maintain our position on the racetrack. Can’t say enough on Adam Stevens, everyone on the team did a great job. Our Toyota Camry was awesome. TRD did a great job with the engines. Look forward to Phoenix next week, maintaining our position. If we can go out there and win, sure, we’d love to win.”

After finishing seventh, Kurt Busch said that his race "was good, hard fought battle with limited practice. We had to go with our best effort to get the set-up. We battled through it. It just wasn’t the winning car we needed to try to advance. The way that we had been running we knew we could get close to fifth. We got seventh today so we will take it.”

Following an eighth–place finish, Martin Truex Jr. said that he "thought we had a shot at it (the win) and the right-front wheel started shaking real bad and got tight. It's a damn shame. It's a good run. ... We had a really good race car." Sitting fourth in the standings six–points back of the lead, he said it certainly helped that "[t]he 2 didn't win the race...I was cheering for Jimmie Johnson pretty hard. We did what we needed to do. It would have been nice to have those five or six spots -- that's five or six points next week. It could be the difference. But we'll just have to wait and see and we'll go race hard again."

Speaking on a ninth–place finish, Jeff Gordon – who's locked into the championship race following his win at Martinsville the week before – said he "thought we learned a lot this weekend. I think we certainly know that our cars are fast because our teammate won. Congrats to him. I think that's awesome he beat the No. 2 (Brad Keselowski). That is spectacular, I'm going to give him a big hug for that. At the same time I think that we were here to execute and push hard, try to win, but also to just learn what we could. I thought we learned some stuff."

Following a 12th–place finish in only his second career Sprint Cup Series start, Erik Jones – who also finished fourth in the Xfinity Series race the previous day and won the Camping World Truck Series race two days prior – said that he was "ready to take the day off. I don’t think I’ve ever run more than two races – a Truck and Xfinity race – in more than one weekend. At this point, I’m feeling fine, but I can definitely feeling it coming on. I’ll be worn out tonight.” He also said that he wished his car "could have been a little stronger there at the end. We had that right front go down and it tore the nose up pretty good, so kind of took us out of a shot at a top-10. To still come home 12th is a good day for us. We worked hard all day to really keep the thing balanced and good and strong.”

Race results

Race statistics
15 lead changes among 8 different drivers
9 cautions for 47 laps
Time of race: 3 hours, 38 minutes, 38 seconds
Average speed: 
Jimmie Johnson took home $462,976 in winnings

Race awards
 Coors Light Pole Award: Brad Keselowski (27.421, 
 3M Lap Leader: Brad Keselowski (312 laps)
 American Ethanol Green Flag Restart Award: Brad Keselowski
 Duralast Brakes "Bake In The Race" Award: Brad Keselowski
 Freescale "Wide Open": Carl Edwards
 Ingersoll Rand Power Move: Kurt Busch (5 positions)
 MAHLE Clevite Engine Builder of the Race: Roush-Yates Engines, #2
 Mobil 1 Driver of the Race: Brad Keselowski (145.0 driver rating)
 Moog Steering and Suspension Problem Solver of The Race: Jamie McMurray (crew chief Matt McCall (0.164 seconds))
 NASCAR Sprint Cup Leader Bonus: No winner: rolls over to $20,000 at next event
 Sherwin-Williams Fastest Lap: Kyle Busch (Lap 2, 28.097)
 Sunoco Rookie of The Race: Brett Moffitt

Media

Television
NBC covered the race on the television side. Rick Allen,  two–time Texas winner Jeff Burton and Steve Letarte had the call in the booth for the race. Dave Burns, Mike Massaro, Marty Snider and Kelli Stavast handled pit road on the television side.

Radio
PRN had the radio call for the race, which was simulcast on Sirius XM NASCAR Radio. Doug Rice, Mark Garrow and Wendy Venturini called the race from the booth when the field was racing down the frontstretch. Rob Albright called the race from atop the turn 2 condo when the field was racing through turns 1 and 2. Pat Patterson called the race from atop the turn 4 suites when the field was racing through turns 3 and 4. Brad Gillie, Brett McMillan, Jim Noble and Steve Richards handled pit road on the radio side.

Standings after the race

Drivers' Championship standings

Manufacturers' Championship standings

Note: Only the first sixteen positions are included for the driver standings.

Note

References

AAA Texas 500
AAA Texas 500
NASCAR races at Texas Motor Speedway